The 2006–07 CERH European League was the 42nd edition of the CERH European League organized by CERH. Its Final Four was held in May 2007 at the PalaBassano, in Bassano del Grappa, Italy.

Preliminary round

|}

First round
The four eliminated teams with more points in the CERH ranking would be dropped to the 2006–07 CERS Cup.

|}

Group stage
In each group, teams played against each other home-and-away in a home-and-away round-robin format.

The two first qualified teams advanced to the Final Four.

Group A

Group B

Final four
The Final Four was played at PalaBassano, in Bassano del Grappa, Italy.

Barcelona achieved its 17th title.

Bracket

References

External links
 CERH website
 Results at Rinkhockey.net

2006 in roller hockey
2007 in roller hockey
Rink Hockey Euroleague